Snuba is form of surface-supplied diving that uses an underwater breathing system developed by Snuba International. 
The origin of the word "Snuba" may be a portmanteau of "snorkel" and "scuba", as it bridges the gap between the two.  Alternatively, some have identified the term as an acronym for "Surface Nexus Underwater Breathing Apparatus", though this may have been ascribed retroactively to fit the portmanteau.  The swimmer uses swimfins, a diving mask, weights, and diving regulator as in scuba diving.
Instead of coming from tanks strapped to the diver's back, air is supplied from long hoses connected to compressed air cylinders contained in a specially designed flotation device at the surface.
Snuba often serves as a form of introductory diving, in the presence of a professionally trained guide, but requires no scuba certification.

Popularity
The snuba system was devised in 1989 by California diver Michael Stafford. It was  developed and patented in 1990 by Snuba International, based in Diamond Springs, California, who own the trademark and licensed it as a touring program. Snuba diving is a popular guided touring activity in tropical tourist locations such as Hawaii, Thailand, the Caribbean, and Mexico.

Snuba is also popular because no certification or prior diving experience is required. Participants only need to be at least 8 years of age, have basic swimming ability, and be comfortable in the water.  Its popularity as a first timer's experience can be attributed to several factors:

The participant tows the raft on the surface via a lightweight harness connected to an air line. This gives the participant the secure knowledge that he/she cannot descend too deep and allows them to choose the depth that they feel most comfortable while being able to control their depth, descent, and ascent rates.
The participant is able to hold on to the raft at the surface using a lanyard that runs the length of the raft on both sides. This also allows the user to hold on to the raft while becoming comfortable breathing before beginning to descend. Being connected to the raft also provides users with a feeling of safety, comfort, and gives them the option to hold on to the raft should they want to return to the surface.
Compared to scuba, snuba divers wear minimal gear. Each diver is equipped with a mask, fins, weight belt, harness, and regulator. The harness holds the regulator and the air line in place, allowing the diver to swim unencumbered beneath the surface.
Although scuba equipment is nearly weightless underwater, out of the water the weight becomes a significant factor for weak individuals. Unlike scuba divers, the snuba diver is not provided with an emergency buoyancy system. This means that in case of emergency, the snuba diver must reach the surface himself or await the arrival of assistance. On the other hand, a correctly weighted snuba diver, will be neutrally buoyant at all depths (no compressible dive suit), has a hose and harness to prevent sinking, can pull on the hose to surface which is less effort than swimming, and has a raft with a grab-rope to hold on to at the surface.

Disadvantages
In a strong current, wave action, or breeze, the combination of underwater hose and surface raft can pull quite hard on a diver. Therefore, Snuba is best used in areas where wind, waves, and current are negligible. Since all snuba use is offered by licensed snuba operators, the possibility of being subjected to strong current, high waves, or high wind is unlikely. However, it is beneficial if one employee of the snuba operator remains on the surface to monitor conditions.

However, as the snuba diver is breathing compressed air so there is still a risk of injury or death due to barotrauma, which is a more severe hazard at shallow depths if divers ascend as little as a few feet without venting the expanding air into their lungs. This danger is easily avoided by breathing normal and continuously while ascending. This point is thoroughly covered in snuba pre-dive briefings, and monitored by the dive guide throughout the dive by watching for the continual release of bubbles from each diver.  

According to the snuba website, since starting operation in 1989, more than 5 million dives have been conducted without injury or fatality, Nonetheless, there has been at least one fatality to a snuba diver and it occurred in April of 2014. The cause of death was not reported so it is unknown if the death was related specifically to the use of snuba or other causes. There is now a snuba liability release form that releases the operators and developers of the snuba system from any liability or responsibility for damage, injury, or death due to neglect, system failure, or any other reason.

References

External links

 www.snuba.com — Snuba International, Inc.

Diving equipment manufacturers
Underwater breathing apparatus
Recreational diving